This was the first edition of the tournament.

Alexander Bublik won the title after defeating Norbert Gombos 5–7, 6–3, 6–3 in the final.

Seeds
All seeds receive a bye into the second round.

Draw

Finals

Top half

Section 1

Section 2

Bottom half

Section 3

Section 4

References
Main draw
Qualifying draw

2019 ATP Challenger Tour